Olsynium douglasii is a species of flowering plant in the iris family (Iridaceae). Common names include Douglas' olsynium, Douglas' grasswidow, grass-widow, blue-eyed grass, purple-eyed-grass, and satin flower, It is the only species in the genus Olsynium in North America, the remaining 11 species being from South America. It was formerly treated in the related genus Sisyrinchium. Despite the common names, it is not a true grass (Poaceae).

The showy flowers appear in early spring and are bell-shaped to star-shaped, 15–25 mm long, with six purple tepals.

It is native to western North America, from southern British Columbia south to northern California, and east to northwest Utah.

There are two varieties:
Olsynium douglasii var. douglasii. Coastal western North America. Flower filaments with a narrow base
Olsynium douglasii var. inflatum. Interior western North America. Flower filaments with an inflated base

This species has won the Royal Horticultural Society’s Award of Garden Merit.

References

External links
Flora of North America — map
Plants of British Columbia
Jepson Flora Project: Sisyrinchium douglasii

Sisyrinchieae
Flora of Idaho
Flora of California
Flora of Nevada
Flora of Oregon
Flora of Washington (state)
Flora without expected TNC conservation status